Hypostomus albopunctatus is a species of catfish in the family Loricariidae. It is native to South America, where it occurs in the basins of the Paraná River and the Paraguay River, including the Iguazu River. The species reaches 40 cm (15.7 inches) in standard length, can weigh up to at least 991 g, and is believed to be a facultative air-breather. While similar to the related species Hypostomus heraldoi, H. albopunctatus can be distinguished by its distinctive pale spots and the length of its fin rays. Its specific epithet, albopunctatus, refers to these spots.

References 

albopunctatus
Fish described in 1908